Dr. Meghnad Saha College is a college in Itahar in the Uttar Dinajpur district of West Bengal, India. The college is affiliated to University of Gour Banga,  offering undergraduate courses.

Departments

Science

Chemistry
Physics
Mathematics

Arts
English
Bengali
Geography
History
Political Science
Philosophy
Sanskrit
Sociology
Physical Education

See also

References

External links 
Dr. Meghnad Saha College
University of Gour Banga
University Grants Commission
National Assessment and Accreditation Council

Colleges affiliated to University of Gour Banga
Academic institutions formerly affiliated with the University of North Bengal
Educational institutions established in 2000
Universities and colleges in Uttar Dinajpur district
2000 establishments in West Bengal